Kerrie Poliness is a contemporary Australian artist, known for her rule-based painting and drawing works that revisit the ideas and practices of conceptual art.

Poliness was born in 1962 and grew up in Melbourne. She completed her Bachelor degree in Victoria University in 1984, majoring in fine art.

She was a co-founder of the Store 5 group of artists, an artist-run space focusing on geometric abstraction.

Public collections 
Poliness's work uses a palette of red, green, yellow and some black,  and appears in public and private collections across Australia and New Zealand.

She is featured in major state galleries such as Art Gallery of Western Australia, National Gallery of Australia, National Gallery of Victoria, Queensland Art Gallery, as well as corporate, private and university collections throughout Australia, including Artbank Australia, Bendigo Art Gallery, Deakin University, Dowse Museum, Griffith University, Maddocks, Margaret Stewart Endowment, Monash University, Museum of Contemporary Art Australia, Museum of Modern Art at Heide, University of Melbourne, and the University of Wollongong.

Exhibitions 
Her exhibitions and collections throughout Australia as well as overseas include:

Solo exhibitions 
 2018   Field Drawing #1, hota, Gold Coast
 2016   Red Matter Wall Drawing #2, Museum of Contemporary Art Australia
 2014   Landscape Paintings (Lake Bolac and Zagreb) and Wave Drawings (orange and green), G-MK, Zagreb
 2013   Field Drawing, the Agora, La Trobe University; Kerrie Poliness: Black O, Dowse Art Museum
 2008   Blue Wall Drawing #1, University of Wollongong
 2007   Blue Wall Drawing, Anna Schwartz Gallery 
 2006   Wall Drawings, Dunedin Public Art Gallery
 2004   Something & Something Somewhere Else, North Melbourne Town Hall; Wall Works, National Gallery of Australia
 1999   The Pipestacks (permanent installation), Pipemakers Park
 1998   Wall Drawings, Artspace, Auckland; Wall Drawings, Art Gallery of Western Australia, Perth
 1997   Black O Wall Drawings 1 - 6, Sarah Cottier Gallery, Sydney
 Red Matter Wall Drawings 1 - 3, Kovacka 3 gallery, Dubrovnik\
 Black O Wall Drawings 3 & 4, Museum of the City of Rovinj, Istria
 1996   Red Matter Wall Drawings #1 - #4, Tolarno Galleries, Melbourne
 1995   Wall Drawing #1, Phoenix Hotel, San Francisco
 Drawings, Sarah Cottier Gallery, Sydney
 Black O Wall Drawings 3 & 4, CBD Gallery, Sydney
 1994   Pavilion #2, Tolarno Galleries, Melbourne
 Red Matter Wall Drawings #1 - #4, Sarah Cottier Gallery, Sydney
 1993   Pivilion #1, No. 140, Store 5, Melbourne
 1992   136 Paintings, Tolarno Galleries, Melbourne
 No. 123, Store 5, Melbourne
 1991   12 Paintings, Tolarno Galleries, Melbourne
 104 Paintings, Deakin University Gallery, Geelong, Victoria
 Wall Painting, No. 99, Store 5, Melbourne
 1990    No.55, Store 5, Melbourne
 1989   No.4, Store 5, Melbourne, No.25, Store 5, Melbourne
 1987   Shattered Plywood Paintings, 312 Lennox Street, Melbourne

Site-specific public artworks 

 2014 Field Drawing #1, Gallery of Modern Art, Brisbane
 2013 Wave Drawings, Highpoint Shopping Centre, Melbourne
 1998 The Agora, La Trobe University, Melbourne
 Black O Wall Drawings, Monash University Library, Melbourne
 2000 The Government Superannuation Building, Melbourne

References

External links 

 Official website

20th-century Australian women artists
20th-century Australian artists
1962 births
Living people